Marco di Carli (born April 12, 1985, in Löningen, Lower Saxony, West Germany) is a German swimmer who specialisms are backstroke and freestyle. He swims at the SG Frankfurt club and is 1.89 metres (6'2") tall and weighs 80 kg (176 lbs).

International career 
He captured bronze in the 100m IM at the European Short Course Swimming Championships.
He competed for Germany at the 2004 Summer Olympics in Athens.

His personal best times are:
 100 metres freestyle – 48"24 (German record)
 50 metres backstroke – 25"53
 100 metres backstroke – 54"76

References

See also
 German records in swimming
 His post on German Wikipedia

1985 births
Living people
German male backstroke swimmers
German male freestyle swimmers
German male swimmers
Swimmers at the 2004 Summer Olympics
Swimmers at the 2012 Summer Olympics
Olympic swimmers of Germany
European Aquatics Championships medalists in swimming
Sportspeople from Lower Saxony
20th-century German people
21st-century German people